The Criminal Code is a law that codifies most criminal offences in Spain. The Code is established by an organic law, the Organic Law 10/1995, of 23 November, of the Criminal Code (Ley Orgánica 10/1995, de 23 de noviembre, del Código Penal). Section 149(6) of the Spanish Constitution establishes the sole jurisdiction of the Cortes Generales over criminal law in Spain.

The Criminal Code is structured through two books. The first book regulates general norms about criminal offenses and penalties and the second book regulates crimes and other dangerous situations, to which the code attributes penalties and security measures, respectively. The Criminal Code is a fundamental law of the Spanish criminal law, because it is a limit to the ius puniendi (or «right to punish») of the State.

The Code was enacted by the Spanish Parliament on 8 November 1995 and it was published in the Official State Gazette (BOE) on 23 November. The Code is in force since 25 May 1996. Since its publication, it has been modified on more than thirty occasions, the last time on 2 March 2019.

Structure 
The current Spanish Criminal Code is divided in two books, thirty-five titles, one hundred and nine chapters and more than six hundred articles.

 PRELIMINARY TITLE. On penal guarantees and on the application of the Criminal Law.
 BOOK I. General provisions on felonies and misdemeanours, the persons responsible, the penalties, security measures and other consequences of criminal offences.
 TITLE I. On felonies and misdemeanours.
 TITLE II. On persons criminally responsible for felonies and misdemeanours.
 TITLE III. On penalties.
 TITLE IV. On security measures.
 TITLE V. On civil liability arising from the felonies and misdemeanours and costs.
 TITLE VI. On ancillary consequences.
 TITLE VII. On expiration of criminal accountability and its effects.
 BOOK II. On felonies and their penalties.
 TITLE I. On unlawful killing and its forms.
 TITLE II. On abortion.
 TITLE III. On bodily harm.
 TITLE IV. On injuries to the foetus.
 TITLE V. Felonies related to genetic engineering.
 TITLE VI. Felonies against freedom.
 TITLE VII. On torture and other felonies against moral integrity.
TITLE VII BIS. On trafficking in human beings.
 TITLE VIII. Felonies against sexual freedom and indemnity.
 TITLE IX. On failure in the duty to assist.
 TITLE X. Felonies against privacy, the right to personal dignityand the inviolability of the dwelling.
 TITLE XI. Felonies against honour.
 TITLE XII. Felonies against relatives.
 TITLE XIII. Felonies against property and against social-economic order.
TITLE XIII BIS. On felonies of illegal financing of political parties.
 TITLE XIV. On felonies against the Exchequer and the Social Security.
 TITLE XV. On felonies against the rights of workers.
 TITLE XV BIS. Offences against the rights of aliens
 TITLE XVI. On felonies concerning organisation of the territory and town planning, protection of the historic heritage and the environment.
 TITLE XVII. On felonies against collective safety.
 TITLE XVIII. On forgery.
 TITLE XIX. On felonies against the public administration.
 TITLE XX. On felonies against the Judicial Power.
 TITLE XXI. On felonies against the Constitution.
 TITLE XXII. Felonies against public order.
 TITLE XXIII. On felonies of treason and against the peace or independence of the Stateand those referring to National Defence.
 TITLE XXIV. Crimes against the International Community.

Before 2015, a third title existed, referring to misdemeanours. However, this title was repealed in the 2015 reform and some of the misdemeanours were transformed into minor criminal offences and others into administrative offences.

History and evolution
The current Criminal Code dates back to 1995, however, since the first code in 1822, several other codes have been approved.

See also
 Spanish Constitution of 1978
 Civil Code of Spain

References

Law of Spain
1995 in Spain
1995 in law
Legal history of Spain
Criminal codes